Roberto Enrique is an actor and singer-songwriter, born and raised in Los Angeles, California, US. He has earned high praises for his work in music and as an actor.

Music

He is a veteran recording artist who had his album debut at the age of 14. Having released two albums of Norteño music—Locamente Enamorado and Condena, distributed by Sony Discos—he was exposed to the music industry from an early age and by 18, he had already begun his professional career singing regional Mexican songs and performing in front of a diverse audience of thousands at venues such as the Los Angeles Memorial Sports Arena, Santa Barbara’s Old Spanish Days Festival, Los Angeles' Fiesta Broadway and countless festivals around the United States.

In October 2006, he released "Nuevo Día”, where he blazes a new musical path with a collection of songs that honor his past while forging a bridge to the future. The musical genre in Nuevo Dia, mixes pop with some Regional Mexican influences. It showcases his passion for art and evokes a young Juan Gabriel with a universal appeal. “Latin American music is a wide spectrum of genres and that has been a big influence in my life”, Roberto tells. “From tango to baladas, salsa and merengue, norteño, banda, rock and pop. These genres have been a fountain of inspiration, and it is my goal to represent Latin music in a new form to audiences around the world.” It is an innovative fusion of styles that honors his cultural roots while taking the music he grew up with in an exciting new direction. Enrique complements the music on Nuevo Día with his carefully crafted lyrics. Inspired by Spanish songwriting greats like José Alfredo Jiménez, Manuel Alejandro and Pablo Milanés, his words are playful and passionate, full of the optimism and romance.

Albums

Nuevo Dia (2006) Planetal Records / DLN Distribution
Condena (2000) Sony Discos
Locamenta Enamorado (1999) Sony Discos

Acting

As an actor, he has appeared on The Shield and Grounded for Life". He also appeared in the Nickelodeon television movie “The Brothers García– Mysteries of the Maya”, which was directed by Jeff Valdez. His work in the short film “Roam” earned him a “Best Actor” nomination at the Independent Film Festival Methodfest. He starred in the Independent film The Hungry Woman (2007).

Selected filmography and television

 Passenger Side (2009)
 Grounded for Life (2004)
 Siempre (2004)
 The Brothers Garcia: Mysteries of the Maya (2003)
 The Shield (2003)
 Los Patriotas (2002)
 Roam (2001)
 Un Pedazo de Tierraaka A Piece of Earth (2001)
 Trauco's Daughter (2001)
 Road Dogz'' (2000)

References

Living people
American singer-songwriters
American male singer-songwriters
American male actors of Mexican descent
Male actors from Los Angeles
Year of birth missing (living people)